Clivina caffra is a species of ground beetle in the subfamily Scaritinae. It was described by Jules Putzeys in 1861.

References

caffra
Beetles described in 1861